Caíque de Jesus da Silva (born 18 July 2000), commonly known as Caíque , is a Brazilian footballer who currently plays for Khor Fakkan on loan from Al-Nasr.

Career statistics

Club

Notes

References

External links
 

2000 births
Living people
Brazilian footballers
Brazilian expatriate footballers
Association football forwards
UAE Pro League players
Esporte Clube Jacuipense players
Esporte Clube Bahia players
Al-Nasr SC (Dubai) players
Khor Fakkan Sports Club players
Expatriate footballers in the United Arab Emirates
Brazilian expatriate sportspeople in the United Arab Emirates
Sportspeople from Salvador, Bahia